The Hours of Charles V is an illuminated book of Hours produced in Paris (possibly by the workshop of Jean Poyer) in the late 15th or early 16th century for Charles V, Holy Roman Emperor. It is now in the Biblioteca Nacional de España.

Charles 05
15th-century illuminated manuscripts
16th-century illuminated manuscripts
Charles V, Holy Roman Emperor